The 14th  Street station is a station on the PATH system. Located at the intersection of 14th Street and Sixth Avenue (Avenue of the Americas) in the Chelsea neighborhood of Manhattan, New York City, it is served by the Hoboken–33rd Street and Journal Square–33rd Street lines on weekdays, and by the Journal Square–33rd Street (via Hoboken) line on weekends.

History
The original station, opened on February 25, 1908, was modified slightly as a result of the building of the Sixth Avenue Line. The platforms were extended to the south, and the northern ends were closed. This allowed the downtown platform to share a street entrance with the downtown IND subway.

The southbound platform was renovated in 1986.

Station layout

This PATH station has side platforms, which are not connected by a crossover or crossunder. The southbound platform shares a mezzanine area with the IND Sixth Avenue Line's station at 14th Street, but the northbound platform exits directly to the street. There is no free transfer between either platform, nor to any of the other stations in the 14th Street/Sixth Avenue station complex.

19th Street station
North of the 14th Street station is the abandoned 19th Street station, which was the original northern terminus of the Hudson and Manhattan Railroad. It opened on February 25, 1908, and closed on August 1, 1954. It is now used for storing mechanical equipment and is still visible from trains travelling between 14th Street and 23rd Street.

Subway connections 
Direct New York City Subway connections include:
 14th Street on the IND Sixth Avenue Line
 14th Street on the IRT Broadway – Seventh Avenue Line via a block-long passageway
 Sixth Avenue on the BMT Canarsie Line

Passengers traveling from New Jersey must exit to street level, enter a nearby subway entrance, and descend to a separate subway mezzanine in order to access the IND station complex.

The entrances for New Jersey-bound PATH commuters are on the southwest and northwest corners of 6th Avenue and 14th Street. The entrance for 33rd Street-bound PATH commuters is on the east side of 6th Avenue, midblock between 13th and 14th Streets. The New School and Union Square are nearby.

References

External links

 PATH - 14th Street Station
 14th Street southbound entrance (shared with NYCS) from Google Maps Street View
 14th Street northbound entrance from Google Maps Street View
 Platform from Google Maps Street View

PATH stations in Manhattan
Sixth Avenue
Railway stations in the United States opened in 1908
Chelsea, Manhattan
West Village
1908 establishments in New York City
Railway stations located underground in New York (state)
14th Street (Manhattan)